Robert Lešnik is a car designer, born 1971 in Maribor, Slovenia. 

After three failed attempts to enter the Academy of Fine Arts and Design, he registered at the University of Pforzheim, and while there he took an exam to work with Volkswagen. He succeeded and stayed at Volkswagen for nine years as exterior design team leader. In April 2007 he moved to Kia Motors and left it in September 2009 for Mercedes-Benz, where he has headed the Exterior Design department, since 2014.

He won the "Designer of the year, 2006" award, a Slovenian award for industrial design.

Design contributions 
 Volkswagen Passat (B6)
 Volkswagen Concept C, concept car for Eos
 Volkswagen Eos design team headed by Peter Schreyer, Head of Volkswagen Design.
 Volkswagen Iroc, concept car for Scirocco
 Volkswagen Scirocco
 Mercedes Benz W205
 Mercedes-Benz W212 (Facelift)
 Mercedes-Benz W222
 Mercedes-Benz GLA
 Mercedes-AMG GT

References

External links

1971 births
Slovenian automobile designers
Living people
Volkswagen Group designers
Pforzheim University of Applied Sciences alumni
People from the City Municipality of Maribor
Mercedes-Benz designers